The Assyrian rebellion ("Nestorian Uprising") was an uprising by the Assyrians in Hakkari which was administered by Assyrians at the time. It began in July 1924 and ended on 28 September that same year. This was the first rebellion in the newly formed Republic Of Turkey. 

(An earlier rebellion by the Assyrian community had taken place in 3–4 September 1924.)

Background 
Assyrians of Tyari and Tkhuma returned to their ancestral land in Hakkari in 1922, shortly after World War I without permission from the Turkish government. In 1924 the Vali (Ottoman term for governor) of Van wrote to Auli Beg who was the Agha of the village of Chal telling him to inform the Assyrians in Hakkari not to worry about their visit. The Vali wanted to discuss whether they had come to Hakkari under the force of the British or wanted to live in Turkey as citizens. The Vali stated that if Assyrians were coming to live as citizens peacefully they would be free to do so. If they were coming by force of the British then they would need to return to Iraq. However the Kurdish Agha Auli Beg lied to the Assyrians and stated that the Turks were planning to expel them by force and annihilate them.

In July 1924 Assyrians met with the Vali of Van. They were stopped by two guards before meeting him but they could not understand each other as the Assyrians were speaking Kurdish and the Turks were speaking Turkish. Another Assyrian man arrived and the Turks say that there were now three Assyrians. One of the Turkish guards lowered his rifle and the Assyrian who had just arrived quickly shot at the guards without aiming and the guards did the same. Both of them missed. However, there were Assyrians who were hidden who began shooting at the Turks and ended up killing a governor and six Turkish soldiers. The vali was wounded in this attack and were later taken and surrendered to the British in Amediya.

Malik Khoshaba expressed his disappointment in what had happened because the Assyrians were tricked by the Kurds into attacking the Turks just like they did in 1915. The Assyrians in Hakkari were put in a difficult situation because the majority of Assyrian fighters were in military service with the British in Iraq. The British reassured the Assyrians that they will assist them with the British army and airplanes.

Battle 
A messenger was sent to Malik Ismael that told him that the Turkish army and their Kurdish allies were waiting to destroy them as they have occupied Julamerg and the district of Leon. A few Assyrian men went to the mountain of Istanbul and confirmed what the messenger had said and saw the large forces of Turks and Kurds.

In the early morning the fighting began and the Turks were bombarding the Assyrians with artillery and machine gun fire. The Assyrians were significantly outnumbered and outgunned and were using British single fire rifles. The Assyrians were waiting for help from the British army or navy but it never arrived and they struggled in battle using the inferior weaponry. Assyrians then retreated to Iraq.

Assyrians then launched a counterattack after gathering in Amediya in the face of Turkish machine gun fire and artillery. Assyrians defeated the Turks in a series of battles and captured several towns in Iraq and the Turks retreated to their border. The victorious battles by the Assyrians in the face of incredible odds was said to be incredible to observers.

British warplanes then arrived and dropped bombs in Asheeta ending the conflict.

Aftermath 
After the British bombed Asheeta, they ordered the Assyrians not to cross the Turkish border to attack and to come back to return to Iraq. Assyrians returned disappointed because the British did not live up to their word of helping them get their ancestral lands.

References 

Conflicts in 1924
Rebellions in Turkey
1924 in Turkey
Assyrian nationalism
History of the Assyrians
Assyrian irredentism